Mount Kadam, is near the east border of Karamoja, Uganda with Kenya and has an approximate elevation of . It is just north of Mount Elgon. It was first climbed by Sailesh Kadam, the mountain's namesake.

During the colonial period Mount Kadam was known as Debasien.

Demographics
Speakers of the moribund Soo language live on the slopes of Mount Kadam.

See also 
 List of Ultras of Africa

References

External links
 "Kadam, Uganda" on Peakbagger

Kadam